TSS Princess Maud was a ferry that operated from 1934 usually in the Irish Sea apart from a period as a troop ship in the Second World War and before being sold outside the United Kingdom in 1965.  She was built by William Denny and Brothers of Dumbarton on the Firth of Clyde for the London Midland and Scottish Railway (LMS). When the LMS was nationalised in 1948 she passed to the British Transport Commission and onward to British Rail in 1962.  She was sold to Lefkosia Compania Naviera, Panama in 1965.  Renamed Venus she was for service in Greek waters. It is understood she saw use as an accommodation ship in Burmeister & Wain, Copenhagen.

Construction
As well as having mechanical stokers and all deck machinery mechanically driven she was the first British ship to have a fire protection automatic sprinkler system. As built she had places for 80 cattle and was on occasion referred to as a cattle boat.

Service

Pre-war service
The LMS ordered Princess Maud and she was completed by William Denny and Brothers of Dumbarton in 1934.  She was a development from the slightly smaller  from the same builders, in 1931.  Both ships worked the Stranraer - Larne crossing in the 1930s.

Second World War service
In the Second World War, Princess Maud served as a troopship and initially operated the Dover—Boulogne route to France from January 1940.

Princess Maud assisted in Dunkirk evacuation but was shelled in the engine room, taking fatalities on 30 May 1940. On 4 June 1940, following repairs, she was able to return to the evacuation, rescuing 1270 in a single trip, being the penultimate ship away from Dunkirk. She subsequently assisted the evacuation of British and French troops from Veules-les-Roses around 12 June 1940, at the time of the surrender of the 51st Highland Division at Saint-Valery-en-Caux, a few miles to the west, transporting 600 British and French troops of the 2,280 rescued.

She then reverted to serving on the Stranraer-Larne route on behalf of the Admiralty until, in 1943, when she received modifications for the planned invasion of France to turn her into a Landing Ship, Infantry, LSI(H), capable of launching six Landing Craft Assault (LCA) boats via hand hoists.

For the D-Day landings, she was attached to the US Task Force O of Operation Neptune covering Omaha beach.

For the remainder of 1944 and into 1945, she worked various cross-Channel routes well past the end of the war in Europe.

Post-war Service

Following a refurbishment after the second world war including a conversion to oil burning she resumed on the Stranraer – Larne route on 1 August 1946. The following year saw her reallocated to the Holyhead — Dún Laoghaire route when the TSS Hibernia and TSS Cambria were laid up due to coal shortages.  With the coming of the MV Cambria and MV Hibernia to the route in 1949 she became the relief ship also covering other routes on the Irish Sea. She had a brief return to the English channel on Southampton Guernsey St Malo for a couple of months in 1951 before returning to Anglesey. By 1963 a British Transport Commission indicated Princess Maud was becoming increasing costly to maintain and passengers were known to avoid travelling on her, she was therefore marked for disposal with an estimated credit of £32,000.

Mediterranean

In 1966 she was sold to Lefkosia Compania Naviera, Panama and underwent a refit emerging painted white with a new name Venus with widened doors for loading cars.  She was operated by Cyprus Sea Cruises of Limassol serving in Mediterranean waters until 1969.  Her route included the ports of Brindisi, Ancona, Piraeus, Limassol and Haifa.

Accommodation Ship

Her final service was as a static accommodation ship known as the Nybo in the Burmeister & Wain shipyard, Copenhagen from 1969.

Fate

In 1973 she was taken to Bilbao, Spain and scrapped.  The Holyhead Maritime Museum holds a plate commemorating the ship's wartime service.

Miscellaneous

An earlier ship of the same name, the SS Princess Maud (1902), operated ferry routes in Scotland.  It was torpedoed and sunk on 10 June 1918 by a U-Boat. The Southend Motor Navigation Company Company operated four craft named Princess Maud overlapping the lifespan of the TSS Princess Maud, one was lost at Dunkirk in 1940.

See also
 Diary account pilot of landing craft from Princess Maud on D-Day

References

External links
 

1933 ships
Ships built on the River Clyde
Ferries of the United Kingdom
Passenger ships of the United Kingdom
Ships of British Rail
Ships of the London, Midland and Scottish Railway